Vladimir N. Kopylov (Russian: Владимир Николаевич Копылов) was a Russian physicist. 

Most of his career he worked in the Institute of Solid State Physics in Chernogolovka, near Moscow.

He received the highest honor for young scientists in the USSR, the Komsomol prize, for his discovery of thermomagnetic and galvanomagnetic waves, which can propagate in metals.

Education 
Kopylov graduated from Moscow Institute of Physics and Technology in 1970, specialising in Radiophysics and Electronics.

Career 
Authoring many papers, his work in collaboration with I. F. Scgegolev and others led to understanding of the Meissner effect in high-Tc superconductors through the surface barrier effect, also known as Bean–Livingston barrier.

References 

Russian physicists
Moscow Institute of Physics and Technology alumni
1947 births
2006 deaths
Scientists from Saint Petersburg